Chelsea Tayui (born 1995) is a Ghanaian model and beauty pageant titleholder who was crowned Miss Universe Ghana in 2020 and represented Ghana at the Miss Universe 2020 pageant.

Early life and education 
Tayui is a native of Keta in the Volta Region of Ghana. She graduated from the DePaul University in Chicago, U.S. with a bachelor's degree in Communications and Media. She is a communications executive currently works part time as the communications director for The KJM Foundation - a non-profit organization (NGO) seeking to create a world where every individual has access to basic human needs. She initially started as a volunteer with KJM working on several developmental projects including clean water projects for impoverished villages in Ghana.

Pageantry

Miss Universe Ghana 2020 
On 26 September 2020, Tayui was crowned Miss Universe Ghana at a private ceremony held at the Labadi Beach Hotel, Accra. Due to complications resolving from COVID-19 pandemic in Ghana, the regular open mass scouting session was not used. She was appointed and crowned after a unanimous decision between MALZ Promotions, organisers of the pageant in Ghana and Miss Universe International, was reached to privately appoint her as the Miss Universe Ghana. As Miss Universe Ghana 2020, she competed at the Miss Universe 2020 pageant.

Miss Universe 2020 
Tayui represented Ghana at the Miss Universe 2020, which was held in May 2021 at Seminole Hard Rock Hotel & Casino in Hollywood, Florida, United States After the competition had been postponed from late 2020 to mid 2021 due to the COVID-19 pandemic. She however did not make it into the Top 21.

References

External links 

UP CLOSE: Miss Universe Ghana
Chelsea Tayui: An Interview with Miss Universe Ghana

Living people
1995 births
DePaul University alumni
Ghanaian beauty pageant winners
People from Volta Region
Ewe people
Miss Universe 2020 contestants
Ghanaian female models
Miss Universe Ghana winners